Simha Gharjane is a 1983 Indian Kannada-language film, directed by S. A. Chandrasekhar and produced by A. R. Raju. The film stars Vishnuvardhan, Vijayashanti, Kalyan Kumar and Sharada. The film has musical score by Chellapilla Satyam. The film was remade by the same director in Tamil as Puthu Yugam (1985)

Cast

Vishnuvardhan
Vijayashanti
Kalyan Kumar
Sharada
Jai Jagadish
Mukhyamantri Chandru
Chethan Ramarao
Dinesh
M. S. Umesh
B. K. Shankar
Thimmaiah
Anuradha
Jayalakshmi
Leelavathi in Guest Appearance
Sundar Krishna Urs in Guest Appearance
Rajanand in Guest Appearance

Production
Following the release of Gedda Maga and Hasida Hebbuli in 1983, director S. A. Chandrasekhar ventured to make another Kannada film. He wrote the screenplay for the story penned by his wife. Veteran producer A.R.Raju decided to produce the movie.Dr.Vishnuvardhan was roped in to play the lead role. Interestingly two notable movies in the career of the lead actor, Sahodarara Saval and Vijay Vikram, were produced by A.R.Raju.Vijayashanti who had made her Kannada debut with Keralida Hennu, plays the female lead. Veteran actors Kalyan Kumar and Sharada were chosen to portray pivotal supporting characters. Jai Jagadish was given an important supporting role while Mukhyamantri Chandru who had become an overnight star through his villainous role in Chakravyuha released in the same year was selected to play another key role. Chellapilla Satyam who worked with the director in Hasida Hebbuli was retained as the music director. The film was given the title Simha Gharjane. In fact, it was the time when Vishnuvardhan became popular among the masses by the title Sahasa Simha.

Release
Released in December Simha Gharjane was one of the last movie releases of 1983. Director S. A. Chandrasekhar had two other movie releases in 1983 – Gedda Maga which was a big hit and Hasida Hebbuli which flopped. Simha Gharjane was the last addition to the list of action oriented movies given by Dr.Vishnuvardhan in the years 1982 and 1983, following the success of Sahasa Simha. Simha Gharjane was the director's last Kannada movie. The movie was a blockbuster  at the box office.

Themes and influences
As the usual Chandrasekhar movies Simha Gharjane was an action drama with a strong social theme. The movie dealt with corruption and battle of justice.

According to Vishnuvardhan's fans, the movie was uniquely influenced by Sahasa Simha in terms of its action based storyline. Onde Guri, Sididedda Sahodara and Oorige Upakari were other such movies. The movie has attained a minor cult following among Vishnu's fans who regard it as one of the best MASS (a word which originated in Tamil audience) movies in his career.

Soundtrack

Chi. Udayashankar and R.N.Jayagopal wrote the lyrics. Chellapilla Satyam scored the music. The song Kannalli Nee Bandu was sung by Vishnuvardhan himself.

References

External links
 

1983 films
1980s Kannada-language films
Films scored by Satyam (composer)
Indian action films
Films directed by S. A. Chandrasekhar
1983 action films